Grapevine-Colleyville Independent School District (GCISD) is a public school district based in Grapevine, Texas, USA. The district serves most of the cities of Grapevine and Colleyville and includes small portions of Euless, Hurst, and Southlake. In addition to being in Tarrant County, the district extends into Dallas County, where it includes parts of Irving and Coppell. The district operates eleven elementary schools, four middle schools, and two traditional high schools, in addition to an early college high school and a virtual school.

In 2009, the school district was rated "recognized" by the Texas Education Agency. In 2018, under the new Texas school rating system, the district received an overall rating of "A" and every campus was rated as "Met Standard".

As of 2018, the district enrolls 13,812 students and has a 97% graduation rate.

Governance 
Grapevine-Colleyville Independent School District, like almost every other school district in Texas, is independent of any city or county government with an elected school board consisting of seven at-large members who appoint a superintendent.

Superintendent 
Dr. Robin Ryan joined GCISD as Superintendent on June 15, 2010. He has served 35 years in education, all in Texas, including as principal of Colleyville Heritage High School from 2004 to 2006. In May 2018, Dr. Ryan was named the 2018 Region XI Superintendent of the Year.

School Board

Schools and Facilities

High Schools (Grades 9-12)

Middle Schools (Grades 6-8)

Elementary Schools (Grades Pre-kindergarten-5)

Athletic Facilities

References

External links

School districts in Dallas County, Texas
School districts in Tarrant County, Texas
Euless, Texas
School districts established in 1869
1869 establishments in Texas